"Te Quiero Mucho" is the first official single from Naty Botero's debut studio album, Naty Botero.

Music video

The story of the music video was inspired by 1970s action movies, especially Russ Meyer.  This concept was developed by the music video director, Diego Álvarez, and also Naty, who was involved in every detail of the video shoot.

The scenes were recreated in Mexico City were the metropolis was the principal character, showing Latin American style and a strong woman fighting at night against criminals, Barbarella style. "Te Quiero Mucho" is a music video directed to show strength and feminine independence, two innate characteristics of Naty Botero.

The director of the video, Diego Álvarez, is radicated on Mexico City and he has been involved with a lot of projects on MTV.

Charts

External links
 http://www.natybotero.com/

2006 debut singles
Colombian songs
2006 songs
Sony BMG Norte singles